Hinganghat railway station is a big railway station between Nagpur and Balharshah sections, located in Maharashtra. Its code is HGT. It serves Hinganghat city. The station consists of three platforms. Amenities include a computerized reservation office, waiting room, retiring room, vegetarian and non-vegetarian refreshments, and book stall. Recently longer platforms were installed.

References 

Nagpur CR railway division
Railway stations in Wardha district